Testfaldet Goitom is an Eritrean footballer who last played for the Western District Toros in the FFSA State League.

International career
Goitom played in the 2009 CECAFA Cup in Kenya, scoring in the 2–1 defeat against Rwanda. Twelve members of the team failed to return to Eritrea after the team were eliminated at the quarter-finals stage.

Personal life

Whilst competing in the 2009 CECAFA Cup in Kenya he was part of the Eritrea national football team which failed to return home after competing in the regional tournament in Nairobi. After receiving political asylum from the Australian government, the team moved to Adelaide, Australia.

References

External links
 

Year of birth missing (living people)
Living people
Eritrean footballers
Eritrea international footballers
Association football midfielders
FFSA Super League players
Croydon Kings players
Adelaide Blue Eagles players
Adelaide Victory FC players
Eritrean expatriate footballers
Expatriate soccer players in Australia
Eritrean refugees